Ritwik Ghatak metro station is an under construction metro station of Line 6 of the Kolkata Metro.

See also
List of Kolkata Metro stations

References 

Kolkata Metro stations